The 2015 Newcastle-under-Lyme Borough Council election took place on 7 May 2015 to elect members of the Newcastle-under-Lyme Borough Council in England. It was held on the same day as other local elections.

Election result

Despite the Labour Party winning the most seats at the 2015 election and not gauging an overall majority, a by-election in 2017 saw the Conservative Party gaining the seat from Labour.

This means the Conservative Party gained control of the council from the previous Labour minority administration.

References

2015 English local elections
May 2015 events in the United Kingdom
2015
2010s in Staffordshire